Nyungwea is a genus of lichen-forming fungi in the family Opegraphaceae. It was circumscribed in 2006 by Emmanuël Sérusiaux, Eberhard Fischer, and Dorothee Killmann, with Nyungwea pallida assigned as the type species.

Species
 Nyungwea anguinella 
 Nyungwea pallida  – Africa
 Nyungwea pycnidiata  – Brazil
 Nyungwea pyneei

References

Arthoniomycetes
Arthoniomycetes genera
Taxa described in 2006
Taxa named by Emmanuël Sérusiaux